Lassirma is a rural locality (a village) in Bizhbulyaksky Selsoviet, Bizhbulyaksky District, Bashkortostan, Russia. The population was 17 as of 2010. There is 1 street.

Geography 
Lassirma is located 12 km southwest of Bizhbulyak (the district's administrative centre) by road. Pchelnik is the nearest rural locality.

References 

Rural localities in Bizhbulyaksky District